Sandra Roma was the defending champion, having won the tennis event in 2012, but she chose not to defend her title.

Karen Barbat won the title, defeating Liubov Vasilyeva in the final, 6–1, 7–6(7–5).

Seeds

Main draw

Finals

Top half

Bottom half

References 
 Main draw

Tampere Open - Women's Singles
2013 Women's Singles